Cuthonella is  a genus of sea slugs, specifically aeolid nudibranchs, marine gastropod molluscs in the family Cuthonellidae.

Species 
Species within the genus Cuthonella include:
 Cuthonella abyssicola Bergh, 1884
 Cuthonella berghi Friele, 1902 
 Cuthonella cocoachroma (Williams & Gosliner, 1979)
 Cuthonella concinna (Alder & Hancock, 1843)
 Cuthonella elenae Martynov, 2000 
 Cuthonella elioti Odhner, 1944
 Cuthonella ferruginea Friele, 1902 
 Cuthonella hiemalis (Roginskaya, 1987)
 Cuthonella modesta Eliot, 1907 
 Cuthonella norvegica Odhner, 1929 
 Cuthonella osyoro (Baba, 1940)
 Cuthonella soboli Martynov, 1992

Species originally described in Cuthonella but currently placed in synonymy include:
 Cuthonella antarctica Eliot, 1907 synonym of Cuthonella elioti Odhner, 1944
 Cuthonella paradoxa Eliot, 1907 synonym of Guyvalvoria paradoxa (Eliot, 1907)

References

Cuthonellidae
Gastropod genera